Songs in A Minor Tour was a concert tour by American singer and songwriter Alicia Keys set out in support of her debut studio album Songs in A Minor (2001). Dates for the concert tour in North America as well as Europe kicked off January 22, 2002 in Wallingford, Connecticut. During the first leg of the tour, Keys played mostly mid-sized venues. From August to October 2001, Keys toured alongside American singer and songwriter Maxwell in the United States. The tour concluded on August 30, 2002 in Virginia Beach, Virginia.

Critical reception
In his review of Keys' concert at the Orpheum Theatre, James Sullivan from SFGate commented that Keys "has a self-confidence that's absolute" and "there's no doubt that Keys wants the spotlight". He further commented that "her voice is undeniably a beautiful thing" and found that during a performance of Fallin', Keys "found a powerful middle ground between her solo ruminations and her frenzied, scale-shredding vocal athleticism". In his review of the Massey Hall concert, Robert Everett-Green from The Globe and Mail wrote that Keys’ “material has changed in the shift from disc to stage, getting bigger and bolder at one end, and more intimate at the other” and “her stage presentation sought and found a path between the pink steel niceness of Mariah Carey and the blatant raunchiness of many women in urban music”. David Segal from The Washington Times was disappointed with the concert at DAR Constitution Hall, writing that Keys’ “intimate stylings were at times overwhelmed by the elaborate staging”.  He found the concert “overproduced” and further opined that Keys “needs to undersell herself by keeping it simple and intimate rather than overpromised and extravagant”.

Opening acts
Musiq Soulchild (North America) (select venues)
Donell Jones (North America)
Glenn Lewis (Canada)

Setlist

 "Beethoven's 5th Symphony"
 "Rock Wit U" (contains elements of "Juicy")
 "The Life"
 "How Come You Don't Call Me"
 "Troubles"
 "Challenge" (DJ vs Band) 
 "Moonlight Sonata" / "Aint Misbehavin"
 "Piano and I"
 "Goodbye"
 "Never Felt This Way"
 "Why Do I Feel So Sad"
 "Butterflyz"
 "Caged Bird"
 "A Song For You"
 "Someday We'll All Be Free"
 "Fragile" [A]
 Spanish Dance Segment [B]
 "Mr. Man"
 "Jane Doe"
 "Shhh"
 "A Woman's Worth"
 "Light My Fire" [B]
 "Girlfriend" (contains elements of "That Girl")
 "Fallin'"

Notes
 A^ Only performed on first leg.
 B^ Only performed on second leg.

Tour dates

Notes

References

Alicia Keys concert tours
2002 concert tours